BIAM Model School and College, Bogura is an educational institution located in Bogura district. This school and college operates under Bangladesh Institute of Administration and Management (BIAM) Foundation. It originally founded as Bogra Model School and College, and Sajib Wajed Joy, son of the  Prime Minister of Bangladesh Sheikh Hasina, laid the foundation stone of the organization. This educational institution is located in Nishindara area of ​​Bogra district. The institute started its educational activities on April 24, 2005 and took part in all public examinations in 2008. The institute has already achieved a lot in the public examinations within the Board of Intermediate and Secondary Education, Rajshahi. The institution won the first place in the Secondary School Certificate (SSC) examination in 2018 in terms of obtaining GPA 5 in Rajshahi Board of Education. At present it is one of the best educational institutions in Bogura.

Teachers 
Mr. Mustafizur Rahman is currently the principal of the school. Md. Dulal Hossain is acting as the vice-principal of the college branch and at the same time Shafika Akhter is acting as the vice-principal of the school branch. In addition, the institution has more than 123 teachers in the college, secondary and primary branches.

Unexpected Events 
On 11 February 2019, a teacher and three external students were stabbed by miscreants during the annual sports competition at BIAM Model School and College, Bogura. In addition, reports of extra fees being paid in the name of session fees and development fees during admissions to several schools and colleges in Bogura in defiance of the High Court order came up in various media, including BIAM Model High School and College, Bogura. In 2020, two teachers were suspended for allegedly harassing two former students.

External links

References 

Schools in Bogra District
Colleges in Bogura District
Educational institutions established in 2003
2003 establishments in Bangladesh